The 1968-69 French Rugby Union Championship was contested by 64 teams divided in 8 pools. The first four of each pool, were qualified for the "last 32".

The  Bègles  won the champsionship beating Toulose in the final.

It was the first bouclier de Brennus, for the Bordeaux's club.while, Toulouse play his first final from 1947.

Qualification round 
In bold the qualified to next round

"Last 32" 
In bold the clubs qualified for the next round

"Last 16" 
In bold the clubs qualified for the next round

Quarter of finals 
In bold the clubs qualified for the next round

Semifinals

Final

External links
 Compte rendu finale de 1969 lnr.fr

1969
France 1968
Championship